Hungry Sister (Hungry Sister Phi-sao Chan Hio) is a Thai web series of GMMTV hosted by Watchara Sukchum (Jennie) and Tawan Vihokratana (Tay) currently available for streaming on YouTube and Facebook Watch.

Each episode features different places where Tay introduces one of his friends to Jennie as they enjoy a meal together. The series premiered on 25 February 2020 and airs every 2nd and 4th Tuesday of the month. It aired its last episode on 21 July 2020.

Episodes

References

External links 
 Youtube Playlist 
 GMMTV

2020 web series debuts
2020 web series endings
2020s YouTube series
Thai web series
GMMTV